Alf Svensson may refer to:
 Alf Svensson (politician)
 Alf Svensson (guitarist)